David Tannenberg (1728–1804) was a Moravian organ builder who emigrated to Pennsylvania. He is cited as the most important American organ-builder of his time.  He constructed a number of organs during his lifetime, as well as other keyboard instruments. Many of the organs that he built are still in use.

Biography

David Tannenberg was born March 21, 1728, in Berthelsdorf, Upper Lusatia. His parents, Johann Tannenberg and Judith Tannenberg, née Nitschmann, had left Moravia as refugees in 1727. Tannenberg attended schools in the Moravian communities of Ronneburg, Marienborn and eventually Herrnhaag.

He received a call to join the Moravian community in Zeist and traveled there in 1748. While in Zeist, Tannenberg began making arrangements to travel with a group of Moravians to Bethlehem, Pennsylvania. He boarded the Moravian ship The Irene and landed in America on May 12, 1749.  He arrived in Bethlehem the same year.  He married Anna Rosina Kern not long after arriving. Anna Rosina Kern was born on March 2, 1721, in Ebersdorf, Upper Lusatia.  According to Moravian church records, the surname Tannenberg was "colloquially, and usually written, Tanneberger."  The couple had three daughters, Rosina, Maria Elizabeth, and Anna Maria.  They had two sons, David and Samuel.

Tannenberg was a joiner by trade and began to practice that trade in Pennsylvania and played a role in the construction of the homes and buildings of Bethlehem.  He designed the steeple of the Moravian Church in Lititz.

In 1778, Tannenberg and twenty-one other members of his congregation took an Oath of Allegiance to the newly formed government of the United States.  This caused some controversy, since the church had remained loyal to King George III.

According to music historian Thomas McGeary, "Tannenberg was the most important eighteenth-century American organ-builder."

Work

In late 1757 or early 1758, Tannenberg began learning the craft of organ building from Johann Gottlob Klemm. In 1758, he assisted Klemm in construction of an organ in Nazareth. After Klemm’s death, Tannenberg did not build any organs for three years. Tannenberg moved to Lititz, Pennsylvania, with his family in 1765. There, he purchased the home of one of the settlers of Lititz named George Klein. He worked out of the house until his death.  He was active in the collegium musicum of Lititz as an organist and string player of the Moravian congregation there and began building organs for Lutheran, Reformed and Moravian Churches.  He was reportedly well regarded in his community.  He was a good performer on the violin and a capable tenor singer.  He also built pianos, harpsichords, and probably a clavichord.  None of those instruments are known to still exist.  However, the directions for building a clavichord still survive and offer insights to building techniques of the time.

In 1762, Klemm died, ending Tannenberg's training. He did not build any organs for the next three years.  Then, from 1765 until his death in 1804, under Tannenberg's guidance, over forty organs were constructed. These were primarily for churches in Pennsylvania.  However, organs were also constructed in Albany, New York, Frederick, Maryland, and Salem, North Carolina.  He had an apprentice, Johann Philip Bachmann.

At the time of its opening on October 10, 1790, the organ Tannenberg constructed at the Zion Church in Philadelphia was the largest in the United States and considered the best of its kind. The front row of metal pipes numbered 100. There were 2000 pipes in the body. The organ had five sets of keys. There was a fire in the church on December 26, 1794, which destroyed the building. The organ was destroyed, except for a few salvaged pipes. Tannenberg later wrote to a friend that, "On the main manual seven stops are now in place, and the pedal are complete, with the exception of five pipes in the Trombone Bass. The Echo is in place and completed. On the upper manual one stop, the Principal, is finished. When all is drawn out on the lower manual, with Pedal, the church is well filled with the volume of sound."

In May 1797, the committee of the Moravian Church in Philadelphia sold the church organ, as it had fallen into a state of decay.  The church paid Tannenberg a sum of eleven shillings and sixpence in November 1797 for tuning of the organ they had commissioned from Peter Kurtz during the interim.  Tannenberg's organs at that time were praised for the tones in the diapasons and in the upper registries, including the 12th, 15th, and sesquialtera.

Legacy

Later years and death
Tannenberg was tuning an organ he had constructed at the Lutheran Church in York, PA when he suffered an episode of apoplexy.  He fell from the bench, struck his head, and was injured.  He subsequently died on May 19, 1804.  The last organ which he had constructed during his lifetime was played for the first time at his funeral.  Children from Lutheran and Moravian congregations sang at graveside services.

References 
Footnotes:

Sources:

Further reading
 "Pleasing for Our Use": David Tannenberg and the Organs of the Moravians

External links

Biography

1728 births
1804 deaths
American pipe organ builders
German emigrants to the Thirteen Colonies
People from Görlitz
Businesspeople from Saxony
18th-century American businesspeople
Businesspeople from Pennsylvania